Ali Fadel Ammar (born 1956) is a Lebanese politician from Hezbollah. He has been a member of the Parliament of Lebanon since 1992. He is one of the most publicized and controversial figures in Hezbollah, and is famous for his outbursts of anger and his radical language. A former professional footballer, he was first elected Shia MP for Baabda District in 1992, failed in 1996 and regained his parliamentary seat in 2000, 2005 and 2009. He is a member of the Resistance Loyalty Bloc.

See also 

 List of members of the 2005–2009 Lebanese Parliament
 List of members of the 2009–2017 Lebanese Parliament
 List of members of the 2018–2022 Lebanese Parliament
 List of members of the 2022-2026 Lebanese Parliament

References 

Living people
1956 births
20th-century Lebanese politicians
21st-century Lebanese politicians
Hezbollah politicians
People from Baabda District

Lebanese Shia Muslims
Lebanese footballers